The 2020–21 Clarkson Golden Knights Men's ice hockey season was the 99th season of play for the program and the 60th season in the ECAC Hockey conference. The Golden Knights represented the Clarkson University and played their home games at Cheel Arena, and were coached by Casey Jones, in his 10th season.

Season
As a result of the ongoing COVID-19 pandemic the entire college ice hockey season was delayed. Because the NCAA had previously announced that all winter sports athletes would retain whatever eligibility they possessed through at least the following year, none of Clarkson's players would lose a season of play. However, the NCAA also approved a change in its transfer regulations that would allow players to transfer and play immediately rather than having to sit out a season, as the rules previously required.

Clarkson was up and down all season, ending their non-conference schedule with just a 5–3 record despite playing mostly Atlantic Hockey teams. The offense began to sputter once the team began its conference slate but the goaltending was strong enough to keep them in most games. Clarkson ended the season in second place in the conference and was on the bubble to make the NCAA Tournament. Just as the team was getting ready to play in the ECAC Hockey Tournament, several team members gathered on campus, violating the school's COVID-19 protocols. As a result, the school ended the team's season and caused the Golden Knights to withdraw from postseason competition. While Clarkson wasn't the first team to end their season prematurely, they were the first ranked team to do so.

Chris Klack, Tommy Pasanen and Jordan Robert sat out the season.

Departures

Recruiting

Roster
As of December 30, 2020.

Standings

Schedule and Results

|-
!colspan=12 style=";" | Regular Season

|-
!colspan=12 style=";" | 
|- align="center" bgcolor="#e0e0e0"
|colspan=12|Participation Cancelled

Scoring statistics

Goaltending statistics

Rankings

USCHO did not release a poll in week 20.

Awards and honors

Players drafted into the NHL

2021 NHL Entry Draft

† incoming freshman

References

Clarkson Golden Knights men's ice hockey seasons
Clarkson Golden Knights
Clarkson Golden Knights
Clarkson Golden Knights
2021 in sports in New York (state)
2020 in sports in New York (state)